KENA (1450 AM) is a radio station licensed to Mena, Arkansas, United States. The station is currently owned by Ouachita Broadcasting, Inc. The station has obtained a construction permit from the FCC to change the city of license to Fort Smith, Arkansas.

References

External links

ENA